William Edge may refer to:

 William Edge (mathematician) (1904–1997), British mathematician most known for his work in finite geometry
 Sir William Edge, 1st Baronet (1880–1948), British Liberal, later National Liberal politician and businessman

See also
Edge (disambiguation)